Adriana Molinari (born 26 November 1967), known professionally as Alex Taylor, is a former beauty pageant winner, model, exotic dancer, and pornographic actress who mainly worked for Vivid Entertainment from around 1998 to 2000.

Early life
She moved to Hampton, New Hampshire from South America with her parents when she was in seventh grade. She was a bathing suit model for a time as a teenager. She is a graduate of Winnacunnet High School.

Career
Molinari was named Miss Hampton Beach, New Hampshire in 1984 and Miss New Hampshire USA in 1991. She started stripping in 1990 in Massachusetts and failed to place in the 1991 Miss USA pageant. In the Spring of 1991, Miss USA pageant officials stripped her of her crown when a national supermarket tabloid publicly revealed that she had been moonlighting as an exotic dancer.

She was a Penthouse Pet in August 1994 under the stage name Alex Taylor and appeared in that adult magazine over thirty times. She has also appeared on the TV shows A Current Affair, Hard Copy, Inside Edition, and Entertainment Tonight.

Personal life
As of 2008, Molinari had retired from the adult industry and was residing in Orlando, Florida.

References

External links
 Archived biography on her Official site
 
 
 

1967 births
American pornographic film actresses
Living people
Miss USA 1991 delegates
Penthouse Pets
People from Buenos Aires
Argentine emigrants to the United States
American female erotic dancers
People from Hampton, New Hampshire
20th-century American people
21st-century American women